It has been proposed that Hungary withdraw from the European Union (EU), which is sometimes referred to as Huxit, Huexit, Hunxit and Hunexit (all being portmanteaus of "Hungary" and "exit"). In Hungary, member of the EU since 2004, right-wing populist politicians have tried to create a comparison between the EU and the former Soviet Union (USSR), seen as a past oppressor in the country. Furthermore, democratic backsliding is a phenomenon present in Hungary. For all of this, it has been suggested that Hungary should leave the EU.

In 2021, the Parliament of Hungary promulgated the so-called Hungarian anti-LGBT law, which aims to ban all content for children that may be considered as "promoting homosexuality" and which makes a relationship between the LGBT community and pedophilia. This received a heavy negative response from other countries of the EU, with Prime Minister of the Netherlands Mark Rutte even suggesting Prime Minister of Hungary Viktor Orbán to leave the EU.

Hungary is legally allowed to leave the EU according to Article 50 of the Treaty on European Union. Therefore, the country could leave the union after the organization of a referendum, for which it would be necessary to change the Constitution of Hungary with the support of two-thirds of the Hungarian parliament. Such a thing was proposed by the Hungarian politician Dóra Dúró, member of the party Our Homeland Movement. However, withdrawal from the EU is not popular among the Hungarian public. A 2016 poll revealed that 68% of Hungarians wanted to stay in the EU and that only 17% preferred to leave. In 2020, support for the EU was even higher, with 85% of polled Hungarians supporting the membership of the country in the union. On 8 May 2022, János Volner, former member of the political party Jobbik, announced that his own political party, the Volner Party, would be renamed to Huxit Party and adopt a Hungarian withdrawal from the EU as its main objective.

References

External links
 

Proposals in Hungary
Portmanteaus
Hungary and the European Union
Withdrawal from the European Union
Euroscepticism in Hungary
Public policy proposals